Daniel Hillier (born 26 July 1998) is a New Zealand professional golfer. He won the 2021 Challenge Costa Brava on the Challenge Tour.

Amateur career
Hillier had a successful amateur career, winning the New Zealand Amateur twice, in 2015 and 2017. He won the Australian Boys' Amateur in 2016 and was twice winner of the New Zealand under-19 championship, in 2015 and 2016. Hillier was also twice winner of the Bledisloe Cup, in 2016 and 2018, as the leading amateur in the New Zealand Open, and was a co-medalist, with Cole Hammer, at the 2018 U.S. Amateur.

As a 17-year-old amateur, Hillier won the 2015 John Jones Steel Harewood Open on the Charles Tour. He beat Jim Cusdin by a stroke after finishing on 277, 11-under-par, with three birdies in his last five holes. He qualified for the 2019 U.S. Open through final qualifying at Walton Heath in England.

Hillier was part of the three-man New Zealand team in the 2018 Eisenhower Trophy in Ireland. The team led by three strokes after three rounds but faded on the final day and finished in fourth place behind Denmark, the United States and Spain. Hillier was tied for third place in the final individual standings with a score of 273, 17 under par.

Professional career
Hillier turned professional in September 2019. In January 2020 he qualified for the PGA Tour of Australasia but after a few starts in early 2020, his year was affected by the COVID-19 pandemic and his appearances were largely limited to the Charles Tour. He had some success on that tour, winning two of the six events, the Brian Green Property Group NZ Super 6 Manawatu in March and the DVS Pegasus Open in October, and ending the year as the winner of the Order of Merit.

In 2021, Hillier qualified for the Open Championship after winning the final qualifying section at Notts Golf Club after rounds of 64 and 69, although he missed the cut in the championship itself. He played most of 2021 on the Challenge Tour, winning the Challenge Costa Brava in October, with a birdie at the final hole.

Amateur wins
2015 New Zealand Amateur, New Zealand U19
2016 Australian Boys' Amateur, New Zealand U19
2017 Grant Clements Memorial Tournament, Wellington Stroke Play, New Zealand Amateur

Source:

Professional wins (5)

Challenge Tour wins (2)

Charles Tour wins (3)

Results in major championships
Results not in chronological order in 2020.

CUT = missed the half-way cut

NT = No tournament due to COVID-19 pandemic

Team appearances
Amateur
Sloan Morpeth Trophy (representing New Zealand): 2016
Nomura Cup (representing Australia): 2017
Bonallack Trophy (representing Asia/Pacific): 2018 (winners)
Eisenhower Trophy (representing New Zealand): 2018

Source:

See also
2022 Challenge Tour graduates

References

External links

New Zealand male golfers
1998 births
Living people